Zandu Realty Limited (formerly Zandu Pharmaceutical Works Limited) is an international pharmaceutical company based in Mumbai, India. Company's core business of manufacturing and dealing in ayurvedic and medicinal preparations.

History
Established in 1910 by Pattani, Prime Minister of the erstwhile state of Bhavnagar with Zandu Bhatt, Zandu went public in 1919 with the issuance of stocks.

The company derives its name from Vaidhya Zandu Bhattji, the original founder of the firm named Zandu Pharmaceuticals. He was a renowned Vaidhya not only of Gujarat but India in late 19th century and  early 20th century. The Vaidhya family's stake has been sold to Emami in 2008 for ₹730 crores

References

Companies based in Mumbai
Pharmaceutical companies of India
Pharmaceutical companies established in 1910
Indian brands
Indian companies established in 1910
Companies listed on the National Stock Exchange of India
Companies listed on the Bombay Stock Exchange
Indian companies established in 1919